Congo Maisie is a 1940 comedy-drama film directed by H. C. Potter and starring Ann Sothern for the second time in the ten film Maisie series as showgirl Maisie Ravier.

Plot

Maisie hides aboard a West African steamer after she discovers that she cannot pay her hotel tab. She winds up in a hospital on a rubber plantation, which she must save from a native attack.

Cast

References

External links
 
 
 
 

1940 films
1940 comedy-drama films
American comedy-drama films
1940s English-language films
Films directed by H. C. Potter
Metro-Goldwyn-Mayer films
Films set in Belgian Congo
American black-and-white films
Films scored by Edward Ward (composer)
1940s American films